Events in the year 1999 in  Turkey

Parliament
20th Parliament of Turkey (up to 18 April)
21st Parliament of Turkey

Incumbents
President – Süleyman Demirel
Prime Minister –
 Mesut Yılmaz (up to 11 January)
Bülent Ecevit (from 11 January)
Leader of the opposition
Recai Kutan

Ruling party and the main opposition
 Ruling party 
Motherland Party (ANAP) with coalition partners Democratic Left Party (DSP) and Democrat Turkey Party (DTP) (up to 11 January)
Democratic Left Party (DSP) (11 January-28 May)
Democratic Left Party (DSP) with coalition partners Motherland Party (ANAP) and Nationalist Movement Party (MHP) (from 28 May)
 Main opposition 
Virtue Party (FP)

Cabinet
55th government of Turkey (up to 11 January)
56th government of Turkey (11 January-28 May)
57th government of Turkey (from 28 May)

Events
11 January – Bülent Ecevit formed a minority government 
15–16 February – Abdullah Öcalan, was arrested in Kenya 
18 April – The General election (DSP 136 seats, MHP 129 seats, FP 11 seats, ANAP 86 seats, True Path Party (DYP) 85 seats. The oldest and most established party, the Republican People's Party (CHP), wasn’t able to receive the 10% necessary to enter parliament.) 
22 April – CHP president Deniz Baykal resigned
23 April – Altan Öymen was elected as the new president of CHP
2 May – Merve Kavakçı was protested in the parliament
30 May – Galatasaray won the championship of the Turkish football league
31 May – Abdullah Öcalan’s trial
17 August – The 7.6  İzmit earthquake shook northwestern Turkey with a maximum Mercalli intensity of IX (Violent), leaving 17,118–17,127 dead and 43,953–50,000 injured.
12 November – The 7.2  Düzce earthquake shook northwestern Turkey with a maximum Mercalli intensity of IX (Violent), leaving 845–894 dead and 4,948 injured.
11 December – During the European Union summit in Helsinki, Turkey’s future membership was approved

Deaths
11 January – Öztürk Serengil (born in 1930), actor
1 February – Barış Manço (born in 1943), singer
16 February – Necil Kazım Akses (born in 1908), composer
18 May – Hayrettin Erkmen (born in 1915), politician
20 June – Konca Kuriş (born in 1960), feminist writer (assassinated)
10 July – Ahmet Taner Kışlalı (born in 1939), political scientist (assassinated)
1 August – Paris Pişmiş (born in 1911), astronomer
3 October – Mübeccel Göktuna (born in 1915) – founder of Women's Party

Gallery

See also
1998-99 1.Lig
Turkey in the Eurovision Song Contest 1999

References

 
Years of the 20th century in Turkey
Turkey
Turkey